RCM Motorsport is a Brazilian auto racing team based in Curitiba, Paraná.

External links
  

Stock Car Brasil teams
Auto racing teams established in 2009
Brazilian auto racing teams